Avibrás Indústria Aeroespacial, based in Jacareí, São José dos Campos, Brazil, is a diversified Brazilian company which designs, develops and manufactures defense products and services. Its range of products encompasses artillery and aircraft defense systems, rockets and missiles such as air-to-ground and surface-to-surface weapon systems, including artillery rocket systems; 70 mm air-to-ground systems and fiber optic multi-purpose guided missiles. It makes  armoured vehicles as well. It also manufactures civilian transportation through a division called Tectran, telecommunications equipment, electronic industrial equipment (Powertronics), automotive painting and explosives.

Main products 

In production
Astros II: A multiple rocket launcher and important product of Avibras, used in six countries. The Astros II was decisive in stopping the Iranian offensive during the Iran–Iraq War (1980–1988) and was used by Saudi Arabia against Iraqi forces during Operation Desert Storm (1991).
 AV VBL 4x4 : Is a Brazilian armoured personnel carrier, used by Malaysian Army.
Guará 4x4: Is another Brazilian armoured personnel carrier.
AV-SS 12/36, a light multiple rocket launcher. It can fire rockets with weight up to 6 kg, and range up to 12 km.
Astros Hawk, the ASTROS HAWK is designed to support light forces through the use of high mobility launcher-vehicles and a variety of ammunition. The ammunition is compatible with the ASTROS II System. The system can place a high volume of fire in a very short period of time, at ranges up to 12 km.
Skyfire, based on its extensive experience with the SBAT 70 (Air-to-Ground Brazilian System) AVIBRAS developed and started to produce and export to its clients the most advanced 70 mm rocket system, the SKYFIRE, a high performance air-to-ground rocket system for employment in any type of combat aircraft or helicopter.
EDT-FILA, state-of-the-art anti-aircraft defense fire control equipment, to detect aircraft and missiles at low altitude, directing the fire of anti-aircraft guns and missiles.
VANT Falcão  a single-engine, MALE Unmanned Aerial Vehicle low-wing composite material and structure.
Under development
MANSUP: The developing jointly with the Mectron to the Navy of Brazil. Is an anti-ship missile with a range of  about 75 km. developed from repowering project missiles MBDA MM40 Exocet Block III from Brazilian Navy with technology transferred by the MBDA.
AV-TM 300: a GPS and/or laser-guided cruise missile, its range is up to 300 km.
AV-SS-150: a GPS guided missile, its range is up to 150 km.
SS-AV-40: a GPS guided missile, its range is up to 40 km. There is no support from the Brazilian government for this project.
FOG-MPM in testing stage, the new generation FOG-MPM (Fiber Optics Guided Multi Purpose Missile), uses fiber optics to permit the operator, without a line of sight to the enemy, to guide the missile to the acquisition and destruction of the target. The use of fiber optics for guidance also makes the missile immune to enemy ECM (Electronic Counter Measures). With the present range of up to 60 kilometers, and a possibility to be further extended to over 100 kilometers, the FOG-MPM may also to be employed as an additional ammunition for the ASTROS II System. Today its employment is against tanks, helicopters and fortifications.
A-Darter a fifth generation short range infrared homing ("heat seeking") air-to-air missile

Gallery

See also
Iron Dome

References

External links
 Avibras homepage

Companies based in São Paulo (state)
Technology companies established in 1961
Defence companies of Brazil
Organisations based in São José dos Campos
Aerospace companies of Brazil
Aircraft manufacturers of Brazil
1961 establishments in Brazil
Brazilian brands